Joachim Faber (born 10 May 1950 in Gießen) is a German lawyer and business executive.

Education

Educated at the University of Bonn, Faber earned his doctorate at the German University of Administrative Sciences in 1982.

Career
Faber worked for 14 years in various positions for Citicorp in Frankfurt and London. He then joined Allianz in 1997, serving as the founding CEO of Allianz Global Investors for 12 years from 2000, during which period he built it into one of the world’s biggest asset managers, with around 1.5 trillion euros ($2 trillion) under management, by the time he retired in December 2011. During his time at the helm, he guided the unit through a number of major acquisitions, including PIMCO, which managed the world’s biggest bond fund at the time.

Faber has been serving as Chairman of the Supervisory Board of German Stock Exchange Group since May 2012, succeeding Manfred Gentz. By 2017, he was criticized by investors for the failed 2016 merger with the London Stock Exchange and a compensation program awarded to Carsten Kengeter who resigned as chief executive in October 2017. Under his leadership, the supervisory board introduced a cap on the annual pay packages of its board members at 9.5 million euros ($11.3 million) each. In 2019, he announced his intention to resign by 2020.

In Munich, Faber shares an office with Ann-Kristin Achleitner, Paul Achleitner, Michael Diekmann and Peter Löscher at Palais Preysing.

Other activities

Corporate boards
 HQ Capital, Member of the Supervisory Board (since 2019)
 Investcorp, Member of the Board of Directors (since 2019)
 HSBC, Non-Executive Director (since 2012), Chairman of the Risk Committee (since 2013)
 HSBC Trinkaus & Burkhardt, Member of the Advisory Board
 Coty, Member of the Board of Directors (since 2010)
 JAB Holding Company, Chairman of the Shareholder Committee
 Osram, Member of the Supervisory Board (2013-2014)

Non-profit organizations
 Wittelsbacher Ausgleichsfonds (WAF), Member of the Supervisory Board
 German Cancer Aid, Member of the Board (since 2015)
 European School of Management and Technology (ESMT), Member of the Supervisory Board
 World Economic Forum (WEF), Chair of the Global Agenda Council on Insurance (2011-2012)
 German Council for Sustainable Development (RNE), former Member (appointed ad personam by the Chancellor)

References

1950 births
Living people
German chief executives
German corporate directors
HSBC people